Alfonso López may refer to:

Alfonso López III (born 1982) Mexican American Super Middleweight boxer
Alfonso López Caballero (born 1944), Colombian Ambassador to London, from 2002
Alfonso López Michelsen (1913–2007), president of Colombia, 1974–1978
Alfonso López Pumarejo (1886–1959), president of Colombia, 1934–1938, and 1942–1945
Alfonso López Trujillo (1935–2008), Colombian Cardinal Bishop, president of the Pontifical Council for the Family
Alfonso H. Lopez (born 1970), Virginia politician
Alfonso López (Panamanian boxer), Panamanian boxer

See also
Alfonso López Pumarejo Airport, main airport in the city of Valledupar, Colombia
Alfonso López Pumarejo Stadium, a soccer stadium in University City of Bogotá
Estadio Alfonso López, a multi-use stadium in Bucaramanga, Colombia